This is a list of uprisings by Irish people against English and British claims of sovereignty over Ireland. These uprisings include attempted counter-revolutions and rebellions, though some can be described as either, depending upon perspective. After the United Irishmen Rebellion, such uprisings became more revolutionary and republican in nature. Following the War of Independence, the partition of Ireland and the creation of the autonomous Irish Free State in 26 of the island's 32 counties in 1922; with the exception of the Irish civil war, most but not all subsequent insurgent activity occurred within the six counties of Northern Ireland, which was retained by the United Kingdom.

See also
List of conflicts in Ireland
Military history of Ireland
Irish nationalism
Irish republicanism
Uprisings led by women

 
Uprisings and counter-revolutions
Uprisings and counter-revolutions
Uprisings